The Bauscat rabbit is an Egyptian breed bred to cope with the Egyptian climate. It is a medium-sized breed intended for meat production. It is similar to another Egyptian breed, the Baladi rabbit.

See also

List of rabbit breeds

References

Rabbit breeds
Rabbit breeds originating in Egypt